Zehev Tadmor (זאב תדמור; born 1937) is a retired Israeli chemical engineer who has served as distinguished professor, president, and chairman of the Technion-Israel Institute of Technology. He is also chairman of the Samuel Neaman Institute for Advanced Studies in Science and Technology, a policy research center. His main research interest is polymer and plastics engineering and processing. He won the Emet Prize in 2005.

Biography 

Tadmor received his B.Sc and M.Sc degrees in chemical engineering from the Technion-Israel Institute of Technology, and his doctorate in chemical engineering from the Stevens Institute of Technology in New Jersey.

Tadmor's main research interest is polymer and plastics engineering and processing. He has published three books and 75 papers in the field.

He worked for the Western Electric Company as a Senior Research Engineer, and then joined the Technion Faculty of Chemical Engineering in 1968. In 1975 Tadmor was appointed a Technion full professor, and in 1988 a Distinguished Technion Professor in the Department of Chemical Engineering. From 1984 to 1988 he served as Dean of the Department of Chemical Engineering.

Tadmor served as President of The Technion from 1990 to 1998. He is Chairman of the Technion-Israel Institute of Technology.

He is also Chairman of the Samuel Neaman Institute for Advanced Studies in Science and Technology, a policy research center.

Accolades
Tadmor was elected a member of the US National Academy of Engineering in 1991 for creative research and his influence on the practice of polymer processing.  He is also an elected member of the Israel Academy of Sciences. 

He was inducted into the Polymer Processing Hall of Fame in 1993, and received the Rotary Prize for "Outstanding Contributions to Higher Education in Israel". Tadmor was awarded an Honorary Doctorate in Industrial Chemistry from the University of Bologna in 1995, and received the Society of Plastics Engineers of the USA "Extrusion Division Distinguished Service Award" and "Outstanding Achievement Award in Plastics Engineering and Technology". He won the Emet Prize in 2005 in Exact Sciences in the field of chemical engineering "for his original and pioneering contribution to the field of polymer processing, transforming it into a new and important engineering discipline, and for his academic leadership as a pre-eminent mentor and researcher in chemical engineering in Israel."

References 

Academic staff of Technion – Israel Institute of Technology
Technion – Israel Institute of Technology alumni
Stevens Institute of Technology alumni
Chemical engineering academics
Members of the Israel Academy of Sciences and Humanities
1937 births
Living people
20th-century Israeli engineers
Technion – Israel Institute of Technology presidents
Israeli chemical engineers
Foreign associates of the National Academy of Engineering
EMET Prize recipients in the Exact Sciences